Chiraiya Assembly constituency is an assembly constituency in Purvi Champaran district in the Indian state of Bihar.

Overview
As per orders of Delimitation of Parliamentary and Assembly constituencies Order, 2008, 20. Chiraiya Assembly constituency is composed of the following: Chiraiya and Patahi community development blocks.

Chiraia Assembly constituency is part of 4. Sheohar (Lok Sabha constituency).

Members of Legislative Assembly

Election results 
In the November 2010 state assembly elections, Avaneesh Kumar Singh of BJP won the newly formed 20 Chiraia assembly seat defeating his nearest rival Laxmi Narayan Pr. Yadav of RJD.

2020

References

External links
 

Assembly constituencies of Bihar
Politics of East Champaran district